Aquatic locomotion or swimming is biologically propelled motion through a liquid medium.  The simplest propulsive systems are composed of cilia and flagella. Swimming has evolved a number of times in a range of organisms including arthropods,  fish, molluscs, amphibians, reptiles, birds, and mammals.

Evolution of swimming

Swimming evolved a number of times in unrelated lineages.  Supposed jellyfish fossils occur in the Ediacaran, but the first free-swimming animals appear in the Early to Middle Cambrian.  These are mostly related to the arthropods, and include the Anomalocaridids, which swam by means of lateral lobes in a fashion reminiscent of today's cuttlefish.  Cephalopods joined the ranks of the nekton in the late Cambrian, and chordates were probably swimming from the Early Cambrian. Many terrestrial animals retain some capacity to swim, however some have returned to the water and developed the capacities for aquatic locomotion. Most apes (including humans), however, lost the swimming instinct.

In 2013 Pedro Renato Bender, a research fellow at the University of the Witwatersrand's Institute for Human Evolution, proposed a theory to explain the loss of that instinct. Termed the Saci last common ancestor hypothesis (after Saci, a Brazilian folklore character who cannot cross water barriers), it holds that the loss of instinctive swimming ability in apes is best explained as a consequence of constraints related to the adaptation to an arboreal life in the last common ancestor of apes. Bender hypothesized that the ancestral ape increasingly avoided deep-water bodies when the risks of being exposed to water were clearly higher than the advantages of crossing them. A decreasing contact with water bodies then could have led to the disappearance of the doggy paddle instinct.

Micro-organisms

Microbial swimmers, sometimes called microswimmers, are  microscopic entities  that have the ability to move in fluid or aquatic environment. Natural microswimmers are found everywhere in the natural world as biological microorganisms, such as bacteria, archaea, protists, sperm and microanimals.

Bacterial

Ciliates
Ciliates use small flagella called cilia to move through the water. One ciliate will generally have hundreds to thousands of cilia that are densely packed together in arrays. During movement, an individual cilium deforms using a high-friction power stroke followed by a low-friction recovery stroke. Since there are multiple cilia packed together on an individual organism, they display collective behavior in a metachronal rhythm. This means the deformation of one cilium is in phase with the deformation of its neighbor, causing deformation waves that propagate along the surface of the organism. These propagating waves of cilia are what allow the organism to use the cilia in a coordinated manner to move. A typical example of a ciliated microorganism is the Paramecium, a one-celled, ciliated protozoan covered by thousands of cilia. The cilia beating together allow the Paramecium to propel through the water at speeds of 500 micrometers per second.

Flagellates
Certain organisms such as bacteria and animal sperm have flagellum which have developed a way to move in liquid environments. A rotary motor model shows that bacteria uses the protons of an electrochemical gradient in order to move their flagella. Torque in the flagella of bacteria is created by particles that conduct protons around the base of the flagellum. The direction of rotation of the flagella in bacteria comes from the occupancy of the proton channels along the perimeter of the flagellar motor.

Movement of sperm is called sperm motility. The middle of the mammalian spermatozoon contains mitochondria that power the movement of the flagellum of the sperm. The motor around the base produces torque, just like in bacteria for movement through the aqueous environment.

Pseudopodia
Movement using a pseudopod is accomplished through increases in pressure at one point on the cell membrane.  This pressure increase is the result of actin polymerization between the cortex and the membrane.  As the pressure increases the cell membrane is pushed outward creating the pseudopod.  When the pseudopod moves outward, the rest of the body is pulled forward by cortical tension.  The result is cell movement through the fluid medium.  Furthermore, the direction of movement is determined by chemotaxis.  When chemoattraction occurs in a particular area of the cell membrane, actin polymerization can begin and move the cell in that direction. An excellent example of an organism that utilizes pseudopods is Naegleria fowleri.

A Simple Animation

Invertebrates

Among the radiata, jellyfish and their kin, the main form of swimming is to flex their cup shaped bodies. All jellyfish are free-swimming, although many of these spend most of their time swimming passively.  Passive swimming is akin to gliding;  the organism floats, using currents where it can, and does not exert any energy into controlling its position or motion.  Active swimming, in contrast, involves the expenditure of energy to travel to a desired location.

In bilateria, there are many methods of swimming. The arrow worms (chaetognatha) undulate their finned bodies, not unlike fish. Nematodes swim by undulating their fin-less bodies. Some Arthropod groups can swim - including many crustaceans. Most crustaceans, such as shrimp, will usually swim by paddling with special swimming legs (pleopods). Swimming crabs swim with modified walking legs (pereiopods). Daphnia, a crustacean, swims by beating its antennae instead.

There are also a number of forms of swimming molluscs.  Many free-swimming sea slugs, such as sea angels, flap fin-like structures. Some shelled molluscs, such as scallops can briefly swim by clapping their two shells open and closed. The molluscs most evolved for swimming are the cephalopods. Violet sea-snails exploit a buoyant foam raft stabilized by amphiphilic mucins to float at the sea surface.

Among the Deuterostomia, there are a number of swimmers as well. Feather stars can swim by undulating their many arms. Salps move by pumping waters through their gelatinous bodies. The deuterostomes most evolved for swimming are found among the vertebrates, notably the fish.

Jet propulsion

Jet propulsion is a method of aquatic locomotion where animals fill a muscular cavity and squirt out water to propel them in the opposite direction of the squirting water. Most organisms are equipped with one of two designs for jet propulsion; they can draw water from the rear and expel it from the rear, such as jellyfish, or draw water from front and expel it from the rear, such as salps. Filling up the cavity causes an increase in both the mass and drag of the animal. Because of the expanse of the contracting cavity, the animal's velocity fluctuates as it moves through the water, accelerating while expelling water and decelerating while vacuuming water. Even though these fluctuations in drag and mass can be ignored if the frequency of the jet-propulsion cycles is high enough, jet-propulsion is a relatively inefficient method of aquatic locomotion.

All cephalopods can move by jet propulsion, but this is a very energy-consuming way to travel compared to the tail propulsion used by fish. The relative efficiency of jet propulsion decreases further as animal size increases. Since the Paleozoic, as competition with fish produced an environment where efficient motion was crucial to survival, jet propulsion has taken a back role, with fins and tentacles used to maintain a steady velocity.  The stop-start motion provided by the jets, however, continues to be useful for providing bursts of high speed - not least when capturing prey or avoiding predators. Indeed, it makes cephalopods the fastest marine invertebrates, and they can out accelerate most fish. Oxygenated water is taken into the mantle cavity to the gills and through muscular contraction of this cavity, the spent water is expelled through the hyponome, created by a fold in the mantle. Motion of the cephalopods is usually backward as water is forced out anteriorly through the hyponome, but direction can be controlled somewhat by pointing it in different directions. Most cephalopods float (i.e. are neutrally buoyant), so do not need to swim to remain afloat. Squid swim more slowly than fish, but use more power to generate their speed. The loss in efficiency is due to the amount of water the squid can accelerate out of its mantle cavity.

Jellyfish use a one-way water cavity design which generates a phase of continuous cycles of jet-propulsion followed by a rest phase. The Froude efficiency is about 0.09, which indicates a very costly method of locomotion. The metabolic cost of transport for jellyfish is high when compared to a fish of equal mass.

Other jet-propelled animals have similar problems in efficiency. Scallops, which use a similar design to jellyfish, swim by quickly opening and closing their shells, which draws in water and expels it from all sides. This locomotion is used as a means to escape predators such as starfish. Afterwards, the shell acts as a hydrofoil to counteract the scallop's tendency to sink. The Froude efficiency is low for this type of movement, about 0.3, which is why it's used as an emergency escape mechanism from predators. However, the amount of work the scallop has to do is mitigated by the elastic hinge that connects the two shells of the bivalve. Squids swim by drawing water into their mantle cavity and expelling it through their siphon. The Froude efficiency of their jet-propulsion system is around 0.29, which is much lower than a fish of the same mass.

Much of the work done by scallop muscles to close its shell is stored as elastic energy in abductin tissue, which acts as a spring to open the shell. The elasticity causes the work done against the water to be low because of the large openings the water has to enter and the small openings the water has to leave. The inertial work of scallop jet-propulsion is also low. Because of the low inertial work, the energy savings created by the elastic tissue is so small that it's negligible. Medusae can also use their elastic mesoglea to enlarge their bell. Their mantle contains a layer of muscle sandwiched between elastic fibers. The muscle fibers run around the bell circumferentially while the elastic fibers run through the muscle and along the sides of the bell to prevent lengthening. After making a single contraction, the bell vibrates passively at the resonant frequency to refill the bell. However, in contrast with scallops, the inertial work is similar to the hydrodynamic work due to how medusas expel water - through a large opening at low velocity. Because of this, the negative pressure created by the vibrating cavity is lower than the positive pressure of the jet, meaning that inertial work of the mantle is small. Thus, jet-propulsion is shown as an inefficient swimming technique.

Fish

Many fish swim through water by creating undulations with their bodies or oscillating their fins. The undulations create components of forward thrust complemented by a rearward force, side forces which are wasted portions of energy, and a normal force that is between the forward thrust and side force. Different fish swim by undulating different parts of their bodies. Eel-shaped fish undulate their entire body in rhythmic sequences. Streamlined fish, such as salmon, undulate the caudal portions of their bodies. Some fish, such as sharks, use stiff, strong fins to create dynamic lift and propel themselves. It is common for fish to use more than one form of propulsion, although they will display one dominant mode of swimming   Gait changes have even been observed in juvenile reef fish of various sizes. Depending on their needs, fish can rapidly alternate between synchronized fin beats and alternating fin beats.

They swim very poorly, rapidly fluttering a dorsal fin and using pectoral fins (located behind their eyes) to steer. Seahorses have no caudal fin.

Body-caudal fin (BCF) propulsion
Anguilliform: Anguilliform swimmers are typically slow swimmers. They undulate the majority of their body and use their head as the fulcrum for the load they are moving. At any point during their undulation, their body has an amplitude between 0.5-1.0 wavelengths. The amplitude that they move their body through allows them to swim backwards.   Anguilliform locomotion is usually seen in fish with long, slender bodies like eels, lampreys, oarfish, and a number of catfish species.
Subcarangiform, Carangiform, Thunniform: These swimmers undulate the posterior half of their body and are much faster than anguilliform swimmers. At any point while they are swimming, a wavelength <1  can be seen in the undulation pattern of the body. Some Carangiform swimmers include nurse sharks, bamboo sharks, and reef sharks. Thunniform swimmers are very fast and some common Thunniform swimmers include tuna, white sharks, salmon, jacks, and mako sharks. Thunniform swimmers only undulate their high aspect ratio caudal fin, so they are usually very stiff to push more water out of the way.
Ostraciiform: Ostraciiform swimmers oscillate their caudal region, making them relatively slow swimmers.  Boxfish, torpedo rays, and momyrs employ Ostraciiform locomotion. The cow fish uses Osctraciiform locomotion to hover in the water column.

Median paired fin (MPF) propulsion
Tetraodoniform, Balistiform, Diodontiform: These swimmers oscillate their median fins. They are typically slow swimmers, and some notable examples include the oceanic sunfish (which has extremely modified anal and dorsal fins), puffer fish, and triggerfish.
Rajiform, Amiiform, Gymnotiform: This locomotory mode is accomplished by undulation of the pectoral and median fins. During their undulation pattern, a wavelength >1 can be seen in their fins. They are typically slow to moderate swimmers, and some examples include rays, bowfin, and knife fishes. The black ghost knife fish is a Gymnotiform swimmer that has a very long ventral ribbon fin. Thrust is produced by passing waves down the ribbon fin while the body remains rigid. This also allows the ghost knife fish to swim in reverse.
Labriform: Labriform swimmers are also slow swimmers. They oscillate their pectoral fins to create thrust. Oscillating fins create thrust when a starting vortex is shed from the trailing edge of the fin. As the foil departs from the starting vortex, the effect of that vortex diminishes, while the bound circulation remains, producing lift. Labriform swimming can be viewed as continuously starting and stopping. Wrasses and surf perch are common Labriform swimmers.

Hydrofoils

Hydrofoils, or fins, are used to push against the water to create a normal force to provide thrust, propelling the animal through water. Sea turtles and penguins beat their paired hydrofoils to create lift. Some paired fins, such as pectoral fins on leopard sharks, can be angled at varying degrees to allow the animal to rise, fall, or maintain its level in the water column. The reduction of fin surface area helps to minimize drag, and therefore increase efficiency. Regardless of size of the animal, at any particular speed, maximum possible lift is proportional to (wing area) x (speed)2. Dolphins and whales have large, horizontal caudal hydrofoils, while many fish and sharks have vertical caudal hydrofoils. Porpoising (seen in cetaceans, penguins, and pinnipeds) may save energy if they are moving fast. Since drag increases with speed, the work required to swim unit distance is greater at higher speeds, but the work needed to jump unit distance is independent of speed. Seals propel themselves through the water with their caudal tail, while sea lions create thrust solely with their pectoral flippers.

Drag powered swimming

As with moving through any fluid, friction is created when molecules of the fluid collide with organism. The collision causes drag against moving fish, which is why many fish are streamlined in shape. Streamlined shapes work to reduce drag by orienting elongated objects parallel to the force of drag, therefore allowing the current to pass over and taper off the end of the fish. This streamlined shape allows for more efficient use of energy locomotion. Some flat-shaped fish can take advantage of pressure drag by having a flat bottom surface and curved top surface. The pressure drag created allows for the upward lift of the fish.

Appendages of aquatic organisms propel them in two main and biomechanically extreme mechanisms. Some use lift powered swimming, which can be compared to flying as appendages flap like wings, and reduce drag on the surface of the appendage. Others use drag powered swimming, which can be compared to oars rowing a boat, with movement in a horizontal plane, or paddling, with movement in the parasagittal plane.

Drag swimmers use a cyclic motion in which they push water back in a power stroke, and return their limb forward in the return or recovery stroke. When they push water directly backwards, this moves their body forward, but as they return their limbs to the starting position, they push water forward, which will thus pull them back to some degree, and so opposes the direction that the body is heading. This opposing force is called drag. The return-stroke drag causes drag swimmers to employ different strategies than lift swimmers. Reducing drag on the return stroke is essential for optimizing efficiency. For example, ducks paddle through the water spreading the webs of their feet as they move water back, and then when they return their feet to the front they pull their webs together to reduce the subsequent pull of water forward. The legs of water beetles have little hairs which spread out to catch and move water back in the power stroke, but lay flat as the appendage moves forward in the return stroke. Also, one side of a water beetle leg is wider than the others and is held perpendicular to the motion when pushing backward, but the leg rotates when the limb returns forward, so the thinner side catches less water.

Drag swimmers experience a lessened efficiency in swimming due to resistance which affects their optimum speed. The less drag a fish experiences, the more it will be able to maintain higher speeds. Morphology of the fish can be designed to reduce drag, such as streamlining the body. The cost of transport is much higher for the drag swimmer, and when deviating from its optimum speed, the drag swimmer is energetically strained much more than the lift swimmer. There are natural processes in place to optimize energy use, and it is thought that adjustments of metabolic rates can compensate in part for mechanical disadvantages.

Semi-aquatic animals compared to fully aquatic animals exhibit exacerbation of drag. Design that allows them to function out of the water limits the efficiency possible to be reached when in the water. In water swimming at the surface exposes them to resistive wave drag and is associated with a higher cost than submerged swimming.  Swimming below the surface exposes them to resistance due to return strokes and pressure, but primarily friction. Frictional drag is due to fluid viscosity and morphology characteristics. Pressure drag is due to the difference of water flow around the body and is also affected by body morphology.  Semi-aquatic organisms encounter increased resistive forces when in or out of the water, as they are not specialized for either habitat. The morphology of otters and beavers, for example, must meet needs for both environments. Their fur decreases streamlining and creates additional drag. The platypus may be a good example of an intermediate between drag and lift swimmers because it has been shown to have a rowing mechanism which is similar to lift-based pectoral oscillation. The limbs of semi-aquatic organisms are reserved for use on land and using them in water not only increases the cost of locomotion, but limits them to drag-based modes.
Although they are less efficient, drag swimmers are able to produce more thrust at low speeds than lift swimmers. They are also thought to be better for maneuverability due to the large thrust produced.

Amphibians

Most of the Amphibia have a larval state, which has inherited anguilliform motion, and a laterally compressed tail to go with it, from fish ancestors.
The corresponding tetrapod adult forms, even in the tail-retaining sub-class Urodeles, are sometimes aquatic to only a negligible extent (as in the genus
Salamandra, whose tail has lost its suitability for aquatic propulsion), but the majority of Urodeles, from the newts to the giant salamander Megalobatrachus,
retain a laterally compressed tail for a life that is aquatic to a considerable degree, which can use in a carangiform motion.

Of the tailless amphibians (the frogs and toads of the sub-class Anura) the majority are aquatic to an insignificant extent in adult life, but in that considerable minority that are mainly aquatic we encounter for the first time the problem of adapting the tailless-tetrapod structure for aquatic propulsion. The mode that they use is unrelated to any used by fish. With their flexible back legs and webbed feet they execute something close to the leg movements of a human 'breast stroke,' rather more efficiently because the legs are better streamlined.

Reptiles

From the point of view of aquatic propulsion, the descent of modern members of the class Reptilia from archaic tailed Amphibia is most obvious in the case of the order Crocodilia (crocodiles and alligators), which use their deep, laterally compressed tails in an essentially carangiform mode of propulsion (see Fish locomotion#Carangiform).

Terrestrial snakes, in spite of their 'bad' hydromechanical shape with roughly circular cross-section and gradual posterior taper, swim fairly readily when required, by an anguilliform propulsion (see Fish locomotion#Anguilliform).

Cheloniidae (true turtles) have found a beautiful solution to the problem of tetrapod swimming through the development of their forelimbs into flippers of high-aspect-ratio wing shape, with which they imitate a bird's propulsive mode more accurately than do the eagle-rays themselves.

Fin and flipper locomotion

Aquatic reptiles such as sea turtles (see also turtles) and extinct species like Pliosauroids predominantly use their pectoral flippers to propel themselves through the water and their pelvic flippers for maneuvering. During swimming they move their pectoral flippers in a dorso-ventral motion, causing forward motion. During swimming, they rotate their front flippers to decrease drag through the water column and increase efficiency. Newly hatched sea turtles exhibit several behavioral skills that help orientate themselves towards the ocean as well as identifying the transition from sand to water. If rotated in the pitch, yaw or roll direction, the hatchlings are capable of counteracting the forces acting upon them by correcting with either their pectoral or pelvic flippers and redirecting themselves towards the open ocean.

Among mammals otariids (fur seals) swim primarily with their front flippers, using the rear flippers for steering, and phocids (true seals) move the rear flippers laterally, pushing the animal through the water.

Escape reactions

Some arthropods, such as lobsters and shrimps, can propel themselves backwards quickly by flicking their tail, known as lobstering or the caridoid escape reaction.

Varieties of fish, such as teleosts, also use fast-starts to escape from predators. Fast-starts are characterized by the muscle contraction on one side of the fish twisting the fish into a C-shape. Afterwards, muscle contraction occurs on the opposite side to allow the fish to enter into a steady swimming state with waves of undulation traveling alongside the body. The power of the bending motion comes from fast-twitch muscle fibers located in the central region of the fish. The signal to perform this contraction comes from a set of Mauthner cells which simultaneously send a signal to the muscles on one side of the fish. Mauthner cells are activated when something startles the fish and can be activated by visual or sound-based stimuli.

Fast-starts are split up into three stages. Stage one, which is called the preparatory stroke, is characterized by the initial bending to a C-shape with small delay caused by hydrodynamic resistance. Stage two, the propulsive stroke, involves the body bending rapidly to the other side, which may occur multiple times. Stage three, the rest phase, cause the fish to return to normal steady-state swimming and the body undulations begin to cease. Large muscles located closer to the central portion of the fish are stronger and generate more force than the muscles in the tail. This asymmetry in muscle composition causes body undulations that occur in Stage 3. Once the fast-start is completed, the position of the fish has been shown to have a certain level of unpredictability, which helps fish survive against predators.

The rate at which the body can bend is limited by resistance contained in the inertia of each body part. However, this inertia assists the fish in creating propulsion as a result of the momentum created against the water. The forward propulsion created from C-starts, and steady-state swimming in general, is a result of the body of the fish pushing against the water. Waves of undulation create rearward momentum against the water providing the forward thrust required to push the fish forward.

Efficiency

The Froude propulsion efficiency is defined as the ratio of power output to the power input:

where U1 = free stream velocity and U2 = jet velocity. A good efficiency for carangiform propulsion is between 50 and 80%.

Minimizing drag
Pressure differences occur outside the boundary layer of swimming organisms due to disrupted flow around the body.  The difference on the up- and down-stream surfaces of the body is pressure drag, which creates a downstream force on the object.  Frictional drag, on the other hand, is a result of fluid viscosity in the boundary layer.  Higher turbulence causes greater frictional drag.

Reynolds number (Re) is the measure of the relationships between inertial and viscous forces in flow ((animal's length x animal's velocity)/kinematic viscosity of the fluid).  Turbulent flow can be found at higher Re values, where the boundary layer separates and creates a wake, and laminar flow can be found at lower Re values, when the boundary layer separation is delayed, reducing wake and kinetic energy loss to opposing water momentum.

The body shape of a swimming organism affects the resulting drag.  Long, slender bodies reduce pressure drag by streamlining, while short, round bodies reduce frictional drag; therefore, the optimal shape of an organism depends on its niche.  Swimming organisms with a fusiform shape are likely to experience the greatest reduction in both pressure and frictional drag.

Wing shape also affects the amount of drag experienced by an organism, as with different methods of stroke, recovery of the pre-stroke position results in the accumulation of drag.

High-speed ram ventilation creates laminar flow of water from the gills along the body of an organism.

The secretion of mucus along the organism's body surface, or the addition of long-chained polymers to the velocity gradient, can reduce frictional drag experienced by the organism.

Buoyancy
Many aquatic/marine organisms have developed organs to compensate for their weight and control their buoyancy in the water.  These structures, make the density of their bodies very close to that of the surrounding water.  Some hydrozoans, such as siphonophores, has gas-filled floats; the Nautilus, Sepia, and Spirula (Cephalopods) have chambers of gas within their shells; and most teleost fish and many lantern fish (Myctophidae) are equipped with swim bladders.  Many aquatic and marine organisms may also be composed of low-density materials.  Deep-water teleosts, which do not have a swim bladder, have few lipids and proteins, deeply ossified bones, and watery tissues that maintain their buoyancy.  Some sharks' livers are composed of low-density lipids, such as hydrocarbon squalene or wax esters (also found in Myctophidae without swim bladders), which provide buoyancy.

Swimming animals that are denser than water must generate lift or adapt a benthic lifestyle.  Movement of the fish to generate hydrodynamic lift is necessary to prevent sinking.  Often, their bodies act as hydrofoils, a task that is more effective in flat-bodied fish.  At a small tilt angle, the lift is greater for flat fish than it is for fish with narrow bodies.  Narrow-bodied fish use their fins as hydrofoils while their bodies remain horizontal.  In sharks, the heterocercal tail shape drives water downward, creating a counteracting upward force while thrusting the shark forward.  The lift generated is assisted by the pectoral fins and upward-angle body positioning.  It is supposed that tunas primarily use their pectoral fins for lift.

Buoyancy maintenance is metabolically expensive.  Growing and sustaining a buoyancy organ, adjusting the composition of biological makeup, and exerting physical strain to stay in motion demands large amounts of energy.  It is proposed that lift may be physically generated at a lower energy cost by swimming upward and gliding downward, in a "climb and glide" motion, rather than constant swimming on a plane.

Temperature
Temperature can also greatly affect the ability of aquatic organisms to move through water.  This is because temperature not only affects the properties of the water, but also the organisms in the water, as most have an ideal range specific to their body and metabolic needs.

Q10 (temperature coefficient), the factor by which a rate increases at a 10 °C increase in temperature, is used to measure how organisms' performance relies on temperature.  Most have increased rates as water becomes warmer, but some have limits to this and others find ways to alter such effects, such as by endothermy or earlier recruitment of faster muscle.

For example, Crocodylus porosus, or estuarine crocodiles, were found to increase swimming speed from 15 °C to 23 °C and then to have peak swimming speed from 23 °C to 33 °C.  However, performance began to decline as temperature rose beyond that point, showing a limit to the range of temperatures at which this species could ideally perform.

Submergence
The more of the animal's body that is submerged while swimming, the less energy it uses. Swimming on the surface requires two to three times more energy than when completely submerged. This is because of the bow wave that is formed at the front when the animal is pushing the surface of the water when swimming, creating extra drag.

Secondary evolution

While tetrapods lost many of their natural adaptations to swimming when they evolved onto the land, many have re-evolved the ability to swim or have indeed returned to a completely aquatic lifestyle.

Primarily or exclusively aquatic animals have re-evolved from terrestrial tetrapods multiple times: examples include amphibians such as newts, reptiles such as crocodiles, sea turtles, ichthyosaurs, plesiosaurs and mosasaurs, marine mammals such as whales, seals and otters, and birds such as penguins. Many species of snakes are also aquatic and live their entire lives in the water. Among invertebrates, a number of insect species have adaptations for aquatic life and locomotion. Examples of aquatic insects include dragonfly larvae, water boatmen, and diving beetles. There are also aquatic spiders, although they tend to prefer other modes of locomotion under water than swimming proper.

Even though primarily terrestrial tetrapods have lost many of their adaptations to swimming, the ability to swim has been preserved or re-developed in many of them. It may never have been completely lost.

Examples are: Some breeds of dog swim recreationally. Umbra, a world record-holding dog, can swim 4 miles (6.4 km) in 73 minutes, placing her in the top 25% in human long-distance swimming competitions. The fishing cat is one wild species of cat that has evolved special adaptations for an aquatic or semi-aquatic lifestyle – webbed digits. Tigers and some individual jaguars are the only big cats known to go into water readily, though other big cats, including lions, have been observed swimming.  A few domestic cat breeds also like swimming, such as the Turkish Van.

Horses, moose, and elk are very powerful swimmers, and can travel long distances in the water. Elephants are also capable of swimming, even in deep waters. Eyewitnesses have confirmed that camels, including dromedary and Bactrian camels, can swim, despite the fact that there is little deep water in their natural habitats.

Both domestic and wild rabbits can swim. Domestic rabbits are sometimes trained to swim as a circus attraction. A wild rabbit famously swam in an apparent attack on U.S. President Jimmy Carter's boat when it was threatened in its natural habitat.

The guinea pig (or cavy) is noted as having an excellent swimming ability. Mice can swim quite well. They do panic when placed in water, but many lab mice are used in the Morris water maze, a test to measure learning. When mice swim, they use their tails like flagella and kick with their legs.

Many snakes are excellent swimmers as well. Large adult anacondas spend the majority of their time in the water, and have difficulty moving on land.

Many monkeys can naturally swim and some, like the proboscis monkey, crab-eating macaque, and rhesus macaque swim regularly.

Human swimming

Swimming has been known amongst humans since prehistoric times; the earliest record of swimming dates back to Stone Age paintings from around 7,000 years ago.  Competitive swimming started in Europe around 1800 and was part of the first modern 1896 Summer Olympics in Athens, though not in a form comparable to the contemporary events.  It was not until 1908 that regulations were implemented by the International Swimming Federation to produce competitive swimming.

See also 

 Animal locomotion
 Aquatic
 Fish fin
 Locomotion in space
 Robot locomotion
 Role of skin in locomotion
 Terrestrial locomotion
 Tradeoffs for locomotion in air and water
 Undulatory locomotion

References

 
Ethology
Swimming
Animal locomotion